Sára Kovářová (born 9 February 1999) is a Czech handballer for RK Krim and the Czech national team.

She participated at the 2018 European Women's Handball Championship.

References

External links

1999 births
Living people
Sportspeople from Písek
Czech female handball players
Expatriate handball players in Turkey
Czech expatriate sportspeople in Turkey
Kastamonu Bld. SK (women's handball) players
21st-century Czech women